"Move (If You Wanna)" is the official first single from Mims' second studio album, Guilt. The song was released to radio in October 2008.

The song was featured in an episode of From G's to Gents. This song was also featured in Step Up 3D (soundtrack). The album was released on 27 July 2010.
 
The music video, directed by Keith Schofield, was released on his official YouTube page on February 14, 2009 and premiered on 106 & Park on February 27.

Following accusations of copying the rapping style for Move (If You Wanna) from Philadelphia rapper Gillie Da Kid, Mims stated he never met Gillie and was not trying to start beef with anyone. Mims and Gillie would later record the remix for Move (If You Wanna) together.

Remix
There was supposed to be an official remix featuring rapper Tech N9ne, but it was never released. Tech N9ne's verse was released on the re-release of his mixtape, Bad Season, under the name "Move (Acapella Remix)".

Charts

References

2008 singles
2008 songs
East Coast hip hop songs
Capitol Records singles